Coaldale is a borough in Bedford County, Pennsylvania,  United States. As of the 2020 census the borough population was 128. The post office serving Coaldale is called Six Mile Run.

Geography
Coaldale is located in northeastern Bedford County at  (40.167641, -78.216200). It is surrounded by Broad Top Township and sits in the valley of Six Mile Run, a tributary of the Raystown Branch of the Juniata River.

Demographics

As of the census of 2000, there were 146 people, 57 households, and 42 families residing in the borough. The population density was 2,960.0 people per square mile (1,127.4/km²). There were 70 housing units at an average density of 1,419.2/sq mi (540.5/km²). The racial makeup of the borough was 98.63% White, 0.68% African American, and 0.68% from two or more races. Hispanic or Latino of any race were 2.74% of the population.

There were 57 households, out of which 38.6% had children under the age of 18 living with them, 50.9% were married couples living together, 12.3% had a female householder with no husband present, and 24.6% were non-families. 19.3% of all households were made up of individuals, and 8.8% had someone living alone who was 65 years of age or older. The average household size was 2.56 and the average family size was 2.86.

In the borough the population was spread out, with 28.8% under the age of 18, 9.6% from 18 to 24, 28.1% from 25 to 44, 25.3% from 45 to 64, and 8.2% who were 65 years of age or older. The median age was 34 years. For every 100 females there were 108.6 males. For every 100 females age 18 and over, there were 103.9 males.

The median income for a household in the borough was $25,167, and the median income for a family was $25,521. Males had a median income of $26,500 versus $18,750 for females. The per capita income for the borough was $10,072. There were 20.5% of families and 20.6% of the population living below the poverty line, including 8.6% of under eighteens and 18.2% of those over 64.

References

Populated places established in 1855
Boroughs in Bedford County, Pennsylvania
1855 establishments in Pennsylvania